Anna Breman (born 13 May 1976) is a Swedish banker and economist. She is currently serving as the First Deputy Governor of the Sveriges Riksbank, the central bank of Sweden.

Education 
Breman gained her BSc in Economics from Uppsala University in 2001, and her PhD in economics from Stockholm School of Economics in 2006. During her PhD, she attended Harvard University as a visiting graduate student. In 2006 she was a visiting researcher at the University of California, San Diego.

Career 
Breman began her career at the World Bank as an intern and consultant for the Health, Nutrition and Population team. After completing her PhD studies, she joined the Swedish Ministry of Finance, then moved to Swedbank as a senior seconomist in the research department in 2013. Breman was named Group Chief Economist in 2015, and later also became Head of Macro Research in 2018. In November 2019, following the departure of Kerstin af Jochnick in September of that year, Breman was appointed Deputy Governor of the Riksbank for a six-year term. She started her term on 1 December 2019.

Personal life 
Breman is married and has two children. She lives in central Stockholm.

References

External links 
 Anna Breman's CV from Sveriges Riksbank

1976 births
Living people
People from Upplands Väsby Municipality
Swedish bankers
Women bankers
Swedish women economists
21st-century Swedish economists
Uppsala University alumni
Stockholm School of Economics alumni